The Ayla-Axum amphorae are conical, carrot-shaped amphorae found around the Red Sea, particularly in the Late Roman/Byzantine period. Originally named after the widest range of finds in the Red Sea, subsequent findings since the mid-1990s indicate that the amphoras originate in Byzantine, or even early Islamic, Aqaba. Hence, the preferred nomenclature is now "Aqaba Amphora." The Aqaba amphora type has been found in many terrestrial sites throughout the region and beyond, such as in Eritrea and Ethiopia: Aksum, where amphora sherds with fabrics light red on the inside, pale gray on the outside, as well as greenish-gray fabric were found by the Deutsche Aksum Expedition (Zahn 1913: 208); Matara dating to the 4th through 7th centuries (Anfray 1990: 118); and Adulis (Paribeni 1907: 551) examples of which are on display in the National Museum in Asmara. Other examples have been found at Berenike in Egypt, where the amphorae date to a circa AD 400 context in what may be the best-stratified examples (Hayes 1996: 159–61); from Aqaba in Jordan where many examples have been found, including their kilns; on The Shipwreck at Black Assarca Island, Eritrea (Pedersen 2008; Pedersen 2000); and in the Mediterranean on the late 6th-century shipwreck at Iskandil Burnu, Turkey that is the sole example yet found in that sea. A number of the amphoras and sherds came to light during excavations at Zafar in Yemen, and eleven of the sherds were subjected to mineralogical analysis, which demonstrated that the amphoras originate in what is now Aqaba, Jordan.

In 2013, an archaeological expedition from Philipps University Marburg to Saudi Arabia led by Ralph K. Pedersen, Rupert Brandmeier, and Gerd Knepel, discovered a shipwreck containing Aqaba amphoras near Jeddah. The site was discovered by Marburg student Matthias Link during a survey along a reef. Along with the amphoras is seemingly a larger corpus of pottery from the late period of Antiquity.

Further reading
Anfray, F. 1990.  Les Anciens Ethiopiens: Siecles d'Historie.  Paris: Armand Colin Editeur.
Hayes, J. W. 1996.  "The Pottery", in S. E. Sidebotham and W. Wendrich (eds.) Preliminary Report of the Excavations at Berenike (Egyptian Red Sea Coast) and Survey of the Eastern Desert, pp. 147–178.  Leiden: School of Asian, African, and Amerindian Studies.
Melkawi, A. – Khairah, ʿA. – Whitcomb, D. 1994. "The Excavation of two Seventh Century Pottery Kilns at Aqaba," Annual of the Department of Antiquities, Jordan 38, 447–468.
Paribeni, R. 1907.  "Richerche Nel Luogo Dell'Antica Adulis", in Monumenti Antichi, volume XVIII.  Milan: Reale Accademia dei Lincei.
Pedersen, Ralph K. “Nautical Archaeology Surveys Near Jeddah, 2012-2013, and Their Connections to the Study of Red Sea Commerce.” In Stories of Globalisation: The Red Sea and the Persian Gulf from the Late Prehistory to Early Modernity, edited by Andrea Manzo, Chiara Zazzaro, and Diana J. de Falco, 301–13. Leiden: Brill, 2019.
 Pedersen, R. K., & Brandmeier, R. (2016). "Nabataean Seafaring and the Search for Shipwrecks in the Red Sea." In N. I. Khairy (Ed.), Studies on the Nabataean Culture II (pp. 11–24). Amman, Jordan: Deanship of Academic Research, University of Jordan.
Pedersen, R.K. 2008. "The Byzantine-Aksumite period shipwreck at Black Assarca Island, Eritrea". Azania XLIII: 77-94
Pedersen, R. K.  2000.  ‘Under the Erythraean Sea: An Ancient Shipwreck in Eritrea’, The INA Quarterly 27.2/3: 3–12.  Institute of Nautical Archaeology.
 Raith, M. – Hoffbauer, R. – Euler, H. – Yule, P. – Damgaard, K.2013. "The View from Ẓafār –An Archaeometric Study of the Aqaba Late Roman Period Pottery Complex and Distribution in the 1st Millennium CE", Zeitschrift für Orient-Archäologie, 6, 320–350, .
Tomber, R. 2008. Indo-Roman trade from pots to pepper, London, .
Yule, P. (ed.), 2013. "Ẓafār, Capital of Ḥimyar, Rehabilitation of a ‘Decadent’ Society, Excavations of the Ruprecht-Karls-Universität Heidelberg 1998–2010 in the Highlands of the Yemen", Abhandlungen Deutsche Orient-Gesellschaft, vol. 29, Wiesbaden 2013, ISSN 0417-2442, .
Zahn, R. 1913.  "Die Kleinfunde", in D. Krencker (ed.) Deutsche Aksum Expedition, volume 2, pp. 199–231.  Berlin: Georg Reimer.

See also
Zafar, Yemen

Amphorae
Ancient pottery
Archaeological discoveries in Ethiopia
Archaeology of the Near East
Archaeology of Eastern Africa